"Join the Club" is an episode of The Sopranos

Join the Club may also refer to:

Join the Club (album), by Lucy Spraggan, or the title track
Join the Club (band), a Philippine rock band
"Join the Club", a 2013 song by Bring Me the Horizon from Sempiternal
"Join the Club", a 2018 single by Hockey Dad from Blend Inn

See also
"Join Our Club", a song by Saint Etienne